The European ratsnake or leopard snake (Zamenis situla), is a species of nonvenomous colubrid snake endemic to Europe, Asia Minor, and the Caucasus.

Geographic range
Z. situla is found in Albania, Bosnia and Herzegovina, Bulgaria, Croatia, Greece, Italy, North Macedonia, Malta, Montenegro, Turkey, Ukraine, and possibly Cyprus.

Description
The leopard snake is gray or tan with a dorsal series of reddish or brown transverse blotches, which have black borders. On each side is a series of smaller black spots, alternating with the dorsal blotches. There is a Y-shaped dark marking on the occiput and nape, a crescent-shaped black band from eye to eye across the prefrontals, and a black band from the postoculars diagonally to the corner of the mouth. The belly is white, checkered with black, or almost entirely back. The dorsal scales are in 25 or 27 rows, and are smooth.

Habitat
Natural habitats of the European ratsnake are Mediterranean-type shrubby vegetation, pastureland, plantations, and rural gardens.

See also
List of reptiles of Italy

References

Further reading
Arnold EN, Burton JA (1978). A Field Guide to the Reptiles and Amphibians of Britain and Europe. London: Collins. 272 pp. + Plates 1-40. . (Elaphe situla, pp. 197–198 + Plate 36 + Map 110 on p. 266).
Linnaeus C (1758). Systema naturæ per regna tria naturæ, secundum classes, ordines, genera, species, cum characteribus, differentiis, synonymis, locis. Tomus I. Editio Decima, Reformata. Stockholm: L. Salvius. 824 pp. (Coluber situla,new species, p. 223). (in Latin).
Venchi A, Sindaco R (2006). "Annotated checklist of the reptiles of the Mediterranean countries, with keys to species identification. Part 2 — Snakes (Reptilia, Serpentes)". Annali del Museo di Storia Naturale "G. Doria", Genova 98: 259–364.

Zamenis
Reptiles described in 1758
Taxa named by Carl Linnaeus
Taxonomy articles created by Polbot